SCMU may refer to:

Panilonco Aerodrome (ICAO code), in Chile
Scottish Commercial Motormen's Union, a former British trade union